The 1922 United States Senate election in Wyoming took place on November 7, 1922. First-term Democratic Senator John B. Kendrick ran for re-election to a second term. He was opposed by Republican Congressman Frank W. Mondell, the Majority Leader of the U.S. House of Representatives. Kendrick won re-election by a wide margin, defeating Mondell, despite his long record of representing the state in Congress, with 57% of the vote to Mondell's 43%. Kendrick was also able to increase his margin of victory from 1916, despite Republicans generally doing well in Wyoming in 1922.

Democratic primary

Candidates
 John B. Kendrick, incumbent U.S. Senator

Results

Republican Primary

Candidates
 Frank W. Mondell, U.S. Congressman from Wyoming's at-large congressional district

Results

General election

Results

References

1922
Wyoming
United States Senate